ASTP: A World of Knowledge Transfer is the European members association for knowledge and technology transfer professionals, formerly known as ASTP-Proton.

Members 
Central to the European knowledge transfer ecosystem, ASTP over 900 members from 45+ countries. (May 2019)

History 
Created in 1999, through the initiative of a multinational group of technology transfer professionals, ASTP is a non-profit organisation based in Leiden, Netherlands.

Activities 
Through training courses and annual conferences, the group aims to professionalise and promote technology and knowledge transfer among universities, public research organisations, and industry.

External links
ASTP website
ASTP website

Higher education organisations based in Europe
Technology transfer